Thyrophorella is a genus of small, air-breathing land snails, terrestrial pulmonate gastropod mollusks in the family Achatinidae. 

Thyrophorella is the only genus in the monotypic subfamily Thyrophorellinae, and is also itself monotypic. It is represented by the single species, Thyrophorella thomensis, which is endemic to São Tomé and Príncipe.

References

Achatinidae
Invertebrates of São Tomé and Príncipe
Endemic fauna of São Tomé and Príncipe
Gastropods described in 1882
Taxonomy articles created by Polbot